Emrullah Şalk (born 28 July 1987) is a Turkish professional footballer who plays as a goalkeeper for Eyüpspor.

Professional career
Emrullah spent the majority of his career as a reserve goalkeeper for Turkish teams in the second divisions. Emrullah made his professional debut for Balıkesirspor in a 2-0 Süper Lig win over Konyaspor on 13 September 2013.

References

External links
 
 
 

1987 births
Living people
People from Fatih
Footballers from Istanbul
Turkish footballers
Manisaspor footballers
Adana Demirspor footballers
Balıkesirspor footballers
Konyaspor footballers
Kayseri Erciyesspor footballers
Eyüpspor footballers
Samsunspor footballers
Çaykur Rizespor footballers
Zeytinburnuspor footballers
Süper Lig players
TFF First League players
TFF Second League players
Association football goalkeepers